Gleneagles railway station serves the town of Auchterarder in Perth and Kinross, Scotland.

History 
The station was opened by the Scottish Central Railway on 14 March 1856 and was originally named Crieff Junction. There was another station with the name of Crieff Junction to the north of this station which was only short-lived. On 1 April 1912 it was renamed Gleneagles.

The station was rebuilt and the junction remodelled by the Caledonian Railway in 1919 following their takeover of the Scottish Central Railway. The Caledonian Railway built the nearby Gleneagles Hotel, which opened in 1925. The hotel served as the location for the G8 summit in 2005 and is a well-known golf resort; Gleneagles hosted the 2014 Ryder Cup.

In anticipation of the 2014 Ryder Cup, Gleneagles railway station underwent a major refurbishment as part of a £7 million program to improve transport infrastructure in the area. Work was completed in April 2014, seeing the old station building regenerated with a lift, new platforms built upon the original ones, the fitting of Passenger information boards, additional regenerative paint work and a newly built car park built to connect with the new main road from the motorway.

The branch line to Crieff closed on 6 July 1964 due to the Beeching Axe.

Services 

The service frequency is however somewhat irregular, with large gaps in the timetable at certain times of day.

Gleneagles is also served by the daily Highland Chieftain through service between Inverness and London King's Cross and the Caledonian Sleeper to London Euston each evening except Saturdays.

From 2018, services from the station will be increased as part of a timetable upgrade package backed by Transport Scotland.  A regular hourly-interval each way service between Glasgow, Perth, and Dundee will be introduced that will stop here.

References

Sources

External links
Video footage of Gleneagles Railway station

Railway stations in Perth and Kinross
Former Caledonian Railway stations
Railway stations in Great Britain opened in 1856
Railway stations served by ScotRail
Railway stations served by Caledonian Sleeper
Railway stations served by London North Eastern Railway
James Miller railway stations
1856 establishments in Scotland